The Plummer Building in Rochester, Minnesota, is one of the many architecturally significant buildings on the  Mayo Clinic campus.  This new "Mayo Clinic" building, opened in 1928, added much needed space to the ever-expanding Mayo practice.  The architect of record is Ellerbe & Co., now Ellerbe Becket.  It was the third building designed by the firm for the Mayo Clinic.  The Mayo Clinic Buildings were listed on the U.S. National Register of Historic Places in 1969, and the Plummer Building was further designated as U.S. National Historic Landmark a week later, designated as Mayo Clinic Building.

History

The early design collaboration between Henry Stanley Plummer and Franklin Ellerbe established the model for future generations of new clinic and hospital buildings. The new 1928 Art Deco Mayo Clinic building was the physical manifestation of the early Mayo partners (Drs. Will and Charlie Mayo, Dr. Stinchfield, Dr. Graham, Dr. Judd, Dr. Henry Plummer, Dr. Millet, and Dr. Balfour) desire to create the first integrated private group practice.

When the building was complete it was the tallest building in Rochester until 2001 when the nearby Gonda Building was completed.

It is topped by a distinctive terra-cotta trimmed tower which contains a 56-bell carillon. The carillon is played daily, and its music can be heard throughout downtown. The tower is lit by floodlights every night and is a centerpiece of the city's skyline. Ray Corwin, of Ellerbe and Round, designed the building's decorative elements. Corwin also was responsible for the design of the decorative elements found in the Chateau Theatre and Oakwood Cemetery gate.

The Plummer Building is among the more than 200 structures designed by the Ellerbe firm in Rochester. They are also the architect of record for other Mayo buildings including the 1914 "Red" Clinic building, the 1922 Mayo Institute for Experimental Medicine building, the 1954 Clinic building, and the 2002 Gonda Building, as well as the Rochester Methodist Hospital.

Its  ornamental bronze doors nearly always stand open, symbolizing eternal willingness to accept those in medical need. They have been closed only to commemorate notable events in Mayo or national history.

See also
Art Deco in the United States
List of tallest buildings in Rochester, Minnesota
List of National Historic Landmarks in Minnesota
National Register of Historic Places listings in Olmsted County, Minnesota

References

External links

 National Historic Landmarks Program - Plummer Building

Bell towers in the United States
Carillons
Hospital buildings completed in 1926
Hospital buildings on the National Register of Historic Places in Minnesota
Mayo Clinic buildings
National Historic Landmarks in Minnesota
Towers completed in 1926
National Register of Historic Places in Olmsted County, Minnesota
Skyscrapers in Rochester, Minnesota